Alabama Presbyterian College was a college in Anniston, Alabama affiliated with the Presbyterian Church. It was founded in 1905, opened in 1906 and continued until 1918 when it became a preparatory school. It was renamed Anniston University School in 1922 and closed in 1923. The school was taken over by Alabama Military Institute.

The college site was on an 11-acre parcel of land at Eighth Street and Leighton Avenue. The college became coeducational in 1917.

The college had a football team (List of defunct college football teams) and baseball team.

The SS John Stagg was a tanker-type Liberty ship named after John Stagg (1864–1915), who was president of Alabama Presbyterian College for Men.

Alumni
Lamar Jeffers, U.S. Representative
Oliver Carmichael, chancellor of Vanderbilt University from 1937 to 1946 and president of the University of Alabama from 1953 to 1957

References

Defunct universities and colleges in Alabama
Presbyterian schools in the United States
1905 establishments in Alabama
1923 disestablishments in Alabama
Educational institutions disestablished in 1923
Educational institutions established in 1905